Jonathan Jakubowicz is a Venezuelan filmmaker and writer, winner of the German Film Peace Prize 2020 for his film "Resistance", and one of the "100 people who most positively influenced Jewish life in 2020" according to the Algemeiner Foundation. His film Secuestro Express was nominated for Best Foreign Language Film at the British Independent Film Awards and was a New York Times "Critics' Pick" in 2005. He is of Polish-Jewish descent.

Career
Secuestro Express became the nation's biggest box office hit at that time.

His film, Hands of Stone (2016), is about the relationship between Panamanian boxer Roberto Durán (played by Édgar Ramírez) and his trainer Ray Arcel (played by Robert De Niro). Hands of Stone premiered in the Cannes Film Festival 2016 and was warmly received with a 15-minute standing ovation. It's the first Latin movie to have a simultaneous wide release in all of Latin America.

His latest film Resistance starring Jesse Eisenberg, who played Mark Zuckerberg in The Social Network, Ed Harris, Edgar Ramirez, Clemence Poesy and others. It tells the story of a group of boys and girls scouts who saved thousands of orphans during the Holocaust. One of them was the legendary resistance fighter Georges Loinger, who met with Jakubowicz and helped him with the research of the film, before he died on December 28, 2018. Georges Loinger was the first cousin of Marcel Marceau and died at 108 years of age.

Resistance was released in the United States on March 27, 2020, by IFC Films during the Coronavirus epidemic, and it became the number one theatrical movie in America for two weeks in a row. Most multiplexes were closed, and only a few independent and Drive-in theaters remained opened, which gave Resistance the most unusual top box office spot of all time. The film was awarded The German Film Peace Prize 2020. And it was in the official selection of the Shanghai Film Festival, The Munich Film Festival, and the Festival du Cinema Americain de Deauville, among others.

Filmography

Film

Television

Novels
In November 2016, Jakubowicz published his first novel Las Aventuras de Juan Planchard, which became a best seller in the Spanish language market. In Venezuela, the book broke sales records and was read in public gatherings, as well as on a community of fifty thousand people that define themselves as "resistance to the Maduro dictatorship (Resistencia Venezuela hasta los tuétanos)", on the app Zello.

In July 2020, Jakubowicz published La Venganza de Juan Planchard, the sequel to his first novel. It immediately rose to the #1 spot in of Best Sellers in Spanish Language Fiction, in Amazon. 
 
Las Aventuras de Juan Planchard was adapted for the stage by 2016 National Medal of Arts award winning theater director Moisés Kaufman at Manhattan’s Tectonic Theater Project.

References

External links
 
 "Jonathan Jakubowicz". The New York Times. Retrieved 14 September 2010.
 Forero, Juan "Venezuelan Filmmaker Finds His Kidnapping Tale Resonates With the Masses".  The New York Times.  6 October 2005. Retrieved 14 September 2010.
 de la Fuente, Anna Maria. "Venezuela lays down law". Variety.  3 September 2006. Retrieved 14 September 2010.
 de la Fuente, Anna Maria. "Up Next: Latin American Filmmakers". Variety.  8 November 2007. Retrieved 14 September 2010.
 Kozloff, Nikolas. Danny Glover, Haiti, and the Politics of Revolutionary Cinema in Venezuela. Venezuelanalysis.com. August 2008. Retrieved 11 September 2010.

Living people
English-language film directors
Spanish-language film directors
Venezuelan film directors
Venezuelan Jews
Venezuelan people of Polish-Jewish descent
Venezuelan novelists
Venezuelan male writers
Male novelists
Year of birth missing (living people)